Pseudacteon formicarum is a kind of parasitic species of flies from the family of Phoridae of the subfamily Metopininae.

Distribution and ecology
Pseudacteon formicarum is found in Europe, and is parasitic on the ants Lasius alienus, Lasius niger, Lasius emarginatus, Lasius flavus, Lasius fuliginosus, Formica sanguinea, Myrmica lobicornis and others.

References

External links
Zipcodezoo

Phoridae
Insects described in 1877
Muscomorph flies of Europe